KXTT (94.9 FM) is a radio station licensed to Maricopa, California, United States; the station serves the Bakersfield area.  The station is owned by Lazer Licenses, LLC.

References

External links

XTT